In military terms, 124th Division or 124th Infantry Division may refer to:

 124th Division (People's Republic of China)
 124th Division (Imperial Japanese Army)
 124th Guards Rifle Division (Soviet Union)